USS Mona II was a United States Navy patrol vessel in commission from 1918 to 1919.

Mona II was built as a private motorboat of the same name. On 11 September 1918, the U.S. Navy acquired her under a free lease from her owner, H. F. McCormick, for use as a section patrol boat during World War I. She never received a section patrol (SP) number, but she was commissioned as USS Mona II.

Mona II conducted patrols along the United States East Coast for the rest of World War I and into 1919. She was returned to McCormick on 7 August 1919.

References
 
 Mona II at Department of the Navy Naval History and Heritage Command Online Library of Selected Images: U.S. Navy Ships -- Listed by Hull Number "SP" #s and "ID" #s -- World War I Era Vessels without Numbers (listed alphabetically by name)
 NavSource Online: Section Patrol Craft Photo Archive Mona II

Patrol vessels of the United States Navy
World War I patrol vessels of the United States